The 1975 Amco Cup was the 2nd edition of the NSWRFL Midweek Cup, a NSWRFL-organised national Rugby League tournament between the leading clubs and representative teams from the NSWRFL, the BRL, the CRL, the QRL and the NZRL.

A total of 28 teams from across Australia and New Zealand played 27 matches in a straight knock-out format, with the matches being held midweek during the premiership season.

Qualified Teams

Venues

Round 1

Round 2

Quarter finals

Semi finals

Final

 *- advanced after a penalty count-back

Awards

Golden Try
 Bill Ashurst (Penrith)

References

Amco Cup
Amco Cup
Amco Cup